Oulu is a city, municipality and a seaside resort of about 210,000 inhabitants in the region of North Ostrobothnia, Finland. It is the most populous city in northern Finland and the fifth most populous in the country after: Helsinki, Espoo, Tampere and Vantaa, and the fourth largest urban area in the country after Helsinki, Tampere and Turku. Oulu's neighbouring municipalities are: Hailuoto, Ii, Kempele, Liminka, Lumijoki, Muhos, Pudasjärvi, Tyrnävä and Utajärvi.

Due to its large population and geopolitically economic and cultural-historical location, Oulu has been called the "capital of Northern Finland". Oulu is also considered one of Europe's "living labs", where residents experiment with new technology (such as NFC tags and ubi-screens) on a community-wide scale. Despite only ranking in the top 2% universities, the University of Oulu is regionally known in the field of information technology. Oulu has also been very successful in recent urban image surveys; in a study published by the Finnish Economic Survey in 2008, it received the best ranking of large cities in image ratings across the country, including ratings from respondents in all provinces.

Once known for wood tar and salmon, Oulu has evolved into a major high-tech centre, particularly in IT and wellness technology. Other prominent industries include wood refining, chemicals, pharmaceuticals, paper, and steel.

Oulu has been chosen as the European Capital of Culture for 2026.

Etymology
The city is named after the river Oulujoki, which originates in the lake Oulujärvi. There have been a number of other theories for the origin of the name Oulu. One possible source is a word in the Sami language meaning 'flood water', but there are other suggestions. At minimum, the structure of the word requires that, if originally given by speakers of a Uralic language, the name must be a derivative. In all likelihood, it also predates Finnish settlement and is thus a loanword from one of the now-extinct Saami languages once spoken in the area.

The most probable theory is that the name derives from the Finnish dialectal word oulu, meaning "floodwater", which is related to e.g. Southern Sami åulo, meaning "melted snow", åulot meaning "thaw" (of unknown ultimate origin). Two other word families have also been speculated to be related. The first is seen in the Northern Savo dialectal word uula and its Sami counterpart oalli, both meaning "river channel". The second is the Uralic root reconstructed as *uwa, meaning "river bed" (reflected as vuo in modern Finnish, also in derivatives such as vuolas "heavy-flowing"). To either of these roots, some Sami variety would have to be assumed having added further derivational suffixes.

History

Oulu is situated by the Gulf of Bothnia, at the mouth of river Oulujoki, which is an ancient trading site. The city proper was founded on 8 April 1605 by King Charles IX of Sweden, opposite the fort built on the island of Linnansaari. This took place after favourable peace settlements with Russia, which removed the threat of attack via the main east–west waterway, the river Oulu.  The surrounding areas were populated much earlier. Oulu was the capital of the Province of Oulu from 1776 to 2009.

In 1822, a major fire destroyed much of the city.  The architect Carl Ludvig Engel, chiefly known for the neoclassical (empire style) buildings around Helsinki Senate Square, was enlisted to provide the plan for its rebuilding. With minor changes, this plan remains the basis for the layout of Oulu's town center. The Oulu Cathedral was built in 1832 to his designs, with the spire being finished in 1844. During the Åland War, part of the Crimean War, Oulu's harbour was raided by the British fleet, who destroyed ships and burned tar houses, leading to international criticism.

Geography

Oulu is located in northern Finland, a considerable distance from the other cities in the country. Mainland Finland's northernmost and southernmost points are roughly equidistant from Oulu. Oulu's coast sits at the Bothnian Bay (Perämeri in Finnish) and the Swedish mainland is about 180 km directly west across the Bothnian Bay.

Subdivisions

Oulu is divided into 106 city districts.

The municipality of Ylikiiminki was merged with the city of Oulu on 1 January 2009. Oulu and the municipalities of Haukipudas, Kiiminki, Oulunsalo, and Yli-Ii were merged on 1 January 2013.

Climate
Oulu has a subarctic continental climate (Köppen Dfc). It is the largest Finnish city entirely in this climatic zone as well as one of the largest such in the world. The typical features are cold and snowy winters with short and warm summers. The average annual precipitation is  falling 105 days per year, mostly in late summer and fall.

Due to Oulu's far northern location, and its frequent overcast skies, it only sees on average 15 minutes of sunlight in December. During the winter solstice days only last 3 hours and 34 minutes with the sun rising 1.9 degrees over the horizon. On the other hand, during the summer solstice days last 22 hours and 3 minutes, with the sun dipping 1 degree below the horizon. This gives Oulu white nights during the summer.
On June 21, 2021, Oulu was struck by the Ahti thunderstorm, causing flooding and fall of trees with the wind blowing at more than 30 meters per second. The storm is known to have killed one person and injured two people.

Demographics

In 2008, there were 316 Swedish-speaking inhabitants as mother tongue, which was 0.2% of the total population, making the city unilingually Finnish-speaking similar to other areas in Northern Finland. With English and Swedish being compulsory school subjects, functional bi- or trilingualism acquired through language studies is not uncommon. In 2007, there were 2,417 foreign citizens living in the city, of whom 618 were from elsewhere in the EU. 51.1% of the population is female.

Oulu, as well as other parts of North Ostrobothnia, is well known as a strong support area of the Conservative Laestadianism revival movement.  A Laestadian background has been estimated to be common in construction sector management.

In 2017, the population grew to over 200,000 inhabitants, making Oulu the fourth Finnish locality with at least 200,000 inhabitants after Helsinki, Tampere and Turku.

Oulu was the site of the 2018 Oulu child sexual exploitation scandal.  Prime Minister Juha Sipilä declared that “Sex crimes against children are inhumane acts of incomprehensible evil.”

Population

Economy

As of 31 December 2008, the active working population was employed as follows:

In 2011, the most important employers were:

Culture

The best known cultural exports of the city of Oulu are the Air Guitar World Championships held annually in August, Mieskuoro Huutajat (also known as Screaming Men), the now defunct metal band Sentenced, and one of the best ice hockey teams in Europe, Oulun Kärpät.

Many artists, writers, and musicians live in the city. A variety of concerts — rock, classical, and jazz — as well as other cultural events take place each year.  Examples include the Oulu Music Video Festival, the Air Guitar World Championships, and the Musixine Music Film Competition, all in August.  In July, the annual rock festival Qstock takes place. The Oulu Music Festival is held in winter and the Oulunsalo Music Festival in summer. The Irish Festival of Oulu takes place each October, and the International Children's Film Festival each November.

Museums in Oulu include the Northern Ostrobothnia museum, the Oulu Museum of Art (OMA), the Tietomaa science center, and the Turkansaari open-air museum.

Notable statues and sculptures in Oulu include a sculpture of Frans Michael Franzén and The Bobby at the Market Place statue.

Finlands' Eurovision representatives 2021 rock band Blind Channel are from Oulu. They placed 6th in the competition.

Kalmah is a melodic death metal-band from Oulu that formed in 1998.

Food
In the 1980s, rössypottu, salmon soup and sweet cheese (juhannusjuusto) were named Oulu's traditional parish dishes.

Sights

Tietomaa, a science center with over 150 exhibits
The Rapids Center, the area in the estuary of the Oulu river consisting of small islands connected with bridges and fountains in the middle of the river, and including a housing area of building blocks planned by Alvar Aalto
The Market Square with the City Library, the City Theatre and old salt and tar storehouses
 Hupisaaret Islands, a large park area located in the estuary of the Oulu river
The F. M. Franzen memorial
The Koitelinkoski rapids
The Northern Ostrobothnia museum
The Pateniemi Sawmill Museum
The Vehicle Museum
The University of Oulu Botanical Gardens (situated in Linnanmaa)
The Arctic Gallery
Technopolis, the technology village
Turkansaari (historical open-air museum)
Spa Hotel Eden and sand beach in Nallikari recreation and tourism area
Mannerheim Park
Old observatory in Linnansaari, built in 1875 on top of the ruins of the Castle of Oulu
Oulu Museum of Art

Churches 

 Cathedral
 Haukipudas Church
 Holy Family of Nazareth Church
 Holy Trinity Cathedral of Oulu
 Kiiminki Church
 Oulujoki Church
 Oulunsalo Church
 St. Luke's Chapel
 Tuira Church
 Ylikiiminki Church

Other points of interest
Oulu Music Video Festival
Air Guitar World Championships
Jalometalli Metal Music Festival
The Irish Festival of Oulu
Laitakari beacon tower
Madetoja Hall, housing the Oulu Music Centre, the residence of the Oulu Symphony Orchestra
Oulu Hall (a large indoor sports facility consisting of a low dome, which looks somewhat like a landed flying saucer)
Terwa Marathon & Run, event in late May (since 1989)
The Terva-skiing event in early March (since 1889)
The Winter Swimming World Championship

Transport

Oulu is served by Oulu Airport, the second largest airport in Finland by passenger volume.

The Port of Oulu is one of the busiest harbours on the Bothnian Bay. It includes four separate harbour areas: Vihreäsaari oil and bulk docks, Nuottasaari docks and Oritkari docks. There is also a ferry service in Oulu, which is mostly used between Oulunsalo and the Hailuoto Island.

The shortest travel time from Oulu railway station to Helsinki Central railway station is 5 h 34 min, operated by VR. Other destinations include Kolari, Rovaniemi, Seinäjoki and Tampere.

The most important road in Oulu is Highway 4 (E8/E75) that runs from Helsinki to Utsjoki via Lahti, Jyväskylä, Oulu, Kemi and Rovaniemi. Other highways running to and from Oulu are Highway 20 to Kuusamo and Highway 22 to Kajaani.

Oulu is notable for its transportation network dedicated to non-motor vehicular traffic, including pedestrians and bicycles (termed "light" traffic in Finland). The network is used year-round. The ratio of walking and cycling traffic pathways to residents is the highest in Finland and the cycling mode share is 20 percent. Oulu is often touted as an excellent city for bicycling, even in winter.

In 2015, a large underground parking facility, Kivisydän (Stone Heart), opened in the city center directly beneath main shopping streets. The parking facility includes two ramps, 900 visitor parking lots (expandable to 1500), six access points to the ground served by 19 elevators (expandable to nine and 25), a service facility for commercial delivery vehicles, and ubi-screens that guide the driver to the selected ground access point and help locate the parked car by its license number.

Solar power 
In 2015, the Kaleva Media printing plant in Oulu became the most powerful photovoltaic solar plant in Finland, with 1,604 solar photovoltaic (PV) units on its roof. Although the city of Oulu, located near the Arctic Circle, has only two hours of weak sunlight in December, the photovoltaic cells work almost around the clock in the summer. The cold climate means the PV panels can get up to a 25% boost per hour, as they don't overheat.

Because the sun is quite low in the sky at this latitude, vertical PV installations are popular on the sides of buildings. These solar walls also capture light reflected from snow.

Snow is not necessarily cleared from rooftop solar installations.

The local utility, Oulun Energia, is owned by the city of Oulu. The energy mix it receives from the Nordic-wide grid includes wood pellets, waste incineration, bioenergy, hydro-electric, geothermal, wind, nuclear, peat, natural gas and coal.

Sports

Ice hockey is the most popular spectator sport in Oulu. The local club Kärpät has won the SM-liiga championship title eight times (1981, 2004, 2005, 2007, 2008, 2014, 2015 and 2018). It has also twice been the runner-up in the IIHF European Champions Cup,   in 2005 and in 2006.

In football AC Oulu plays in Veikkausliiga, the premier division of Finnish football. So far OPS has claimed the Finnish football championship only twice by winning Mestaruussarja in 1979 and in 1980. Other notable football clubs include OLS, OTP and JS Hercules.

Oulu has one well-known bandy club, OLS, which plays in Bandyliiga and has become Finnish champions 14 times, most recently in 2014. The other bandy club, OPS, with its 7 championships and a bronze medal as late as in 2009, announced it would be closing down after the 2009–10 season. In 2001 the city was the main venue for the Bandy World Championship.

Oulu is also home to several other sports clubs such as Oulu Northern Lights (American football), Oulun NMKY (Basketball), Oulun Lippo (Pesäpallo), Oulun Pyrintö (Track and field), SK Pohjantähti (Orienteering)), OYUS (Rugby union), Oulu Irish Elks (Gaelic football) and ETTA (Volleyball).

Oulun Tervahiihto is an annual ski marathon event held since 1889.

Terwa Run & Marathon is an annual running event held since 1989 in late May.

Education

The University of Oulu and Oulu University of Applied Sciences have their main campuses located in Oulu.

Oulu is home to the most northerly architecture school in the world. The school is best known for its strong regionalistic ideas for developing architecture. This movement is named "the Oulu school" ("Oulun koulu") of architecture. 

Oulu Vocational College has over 13 000 students. It houses several different study subjects in different units which are spread over Oulu and neighbouring municipalities. Oulu Vocational College School of Business Studies is one of the few vocational schools which has game programming in its curriculum.

Oulu International School is one of nine schools in Finland offering basic education in English. There's also a Swedish-speaking private school (Swedish Svenska Privatskolan i Uleåborg) for students up until high school. The school is the northernmost Swedish-speaking school in Finland.

Notable people
 Saara Aalto, singer, X Factor UK finalist
 Eero Aho, actor
 Outi Alanko-Kahiluoto, politician
 Peter von Bagh, film historian and director 
 Blind Channel, a post-hardcore and nu metal band
 Vladislav Delay, electronic musician
 Eeva Riitta Fingerroos, Paralympic swimmer
 Frans Michael Franzén, poet
 Lars Gallenius, 17th century painter
 Heidi Hautala, politician
 Matti Hautamäki, ski jumper
 Aaro Hellaakoski, poet
 John von Julin, pharmacist, factory owner and vuorineuvos
 Yrjö Kallinen, politician
 Jorma Kontio, harness driver
 Pekka Korpi, harness driver
 V.A. Koskenniemi, poet
 Ville Laihiala, musician and former frontman of the discontinued local metal band Sentenced
 Vilho Lampi, painter
 Taavetti Lukkarinen, former foreman of Kemi Oy; man who convicted to death and hanged of treason
 Fanni Luukkonen, the leader of Lotta Svärd
 Leevi Madetoja, composer
 Impaled Nazarene, nuclear metal band
 Iivo Niskanen, Olympic champion cross-country skier
 Kerttu Niskanen, cross-country skier
 Patrik Pasma, racing driver
 Leena Peltonen-Palotie, geneticist
 Susanna Pöykiö, figure skater
 Ville Ranta, comic artist
 Mika Ronkainen, filmmaker
 Keke Rosberg, 1982 Formula One world champion
 Kauko Röyhkä, author and rock musician
 Mikael Toppelius, church painter
 Juha Väätäinen, athlete
 Sara Wacklin, teacher and writer
 Three former presidents of the country Kaarlo Juho Ståhlberg, Kyösti Kallio and Martti Ahtisaari, also a Nobel Peace Prize laureate
 Ice Hockey players: Kari Jalonen, Mikael Granlund, Markus Granlund, Joni Pitkänen, Reijo Ruotsalainen, Mika Pyörälä, Lasse Kukkonen, Markus Nutivaara and Sebastian Aho
 Football/soccer players: Niko Heiskanen, Aki Lahtinen, Antti Niemi, Mika Nurmela and Seppo Pyykkö

International relations

Twin towns and sister cities
Oulu is twinned with:

 Alta, Norway (since 1948)
 Arkhangelsk, Russia (since 1993)
 Astana, Kazakhstan (since 2013)
 Boden, Sweden (since 1948)
 Bursa, Turkey (since 1978)
 Halle, Germany (since 1968)
 Leverkusen, Germany (since 1968)
 Odesa, Ukraine (since 1957)
 Siófok, Hungary (since 1978)
 Hangzhou, China (since 2010)

Oulu also maintains relationships with cities twinned to former municipalities merged with Oulu in 2013:

  Matera, Italy (twinned with Oulunsalo since 2010)
  Szigetszentmiklós, Hungary (twinned with Haukipudas since 1992)
  Kronstadt, Russia (twinned with Haukipudas, Kiiminki, and Yli-Ii since 1991)

Partnership and twinning cities
In addition Oulu has eight 'Partnership & Twinning cities':

 Glasgow, UK
 Ilembula, Tanzania
 Karlsruhe, Germany
 Luleå, Sweden
 Matagalpa, Nicaragua
 Sendai, Japan (since 2005)
 Umeå, Sweden
 Vienne, France

International municipal projects
The educational department was a part of the Lifelong Learning Programme 2007–2013 in Finland.

See also

References

External links 

Visitoulu.fi – VisitOulu.fi – Official tourism website of Oulu

 
Cities and towns in Finland
Grand Duchy of Finland
Seaside resorts in Finland
Port cities and towns of the Baltic Sea
1605 establishments in Sweden
Populated places established in 1605